Clementine Chambon is a chemical engineer at Imperial College London who works on energy solutions for  energy-deprived countries. She is the CTO of Oorja Development Solutions, a social enterprise that provides clean energy access to off-grid communities in rural India.

Education 
Chambon completed her Masters in Chemical Engineering at the University of Cambridge in 2014. During her degree, she was an intern at Mars Petcare in Verden, Northern Germany. She was awarded a graduate prize from the Salters' Institute of Industrial Chemistry. Chambon completed her PhD in lignocellulosic biofuels in 2017 funded by an Imperial College President's PhD Scholarship and the Grantham Institute for Climate Change.

Research 
Chambon received an Echoing Green Climate Fellowship with a grant of $90,000 in 2015. She has technical experience with biomass gasification systems and deployment of viable emerging decentralised energy solutions. In 2017 she won the Institution of Chemical Engineers Young Researcher Award. She is an EPSRC doctoral prize fellow at Imperial College London working on biomass gasification and its application for rural electrification.

Oorja Development Solutions 
Chambon is co-founder and chief technology officer of Oorja. She says she came up with Oorja during Climate-KIC Journey, a summer school that teaches climate entrepreneurship, in August 2014. Oorja provides rural off-grid communities in India with clean energy and biochar. Chambon is responsible for the design and build of Oorja's easily operable mini power plants, which transform agricultural waste into affordable electricity and can be run by local people. Oorja's mission is to impact one million people by 2025. They subsidise electricity for low-income households, women-led households, schools, health centres and off-grid street lights.

In 2016 Chambon was included Forbes' 30 Under 30 List for top Social Entrepreneurs. She was also listed in MIT Technology Review's list of French innovators under 35 years old. In 2017 Oorja used electrified 100 homes in Uttar Pradesh's Sarvantara Village, providing energy for 1,00 people.

References 

Living people
French women engineers
Women chemical engineers
French chemical engineers
Academics of Imperial College London
Women founders
21st-century women engineers
Year of birth missing (living people)